The 1969 Brisbane Rugby League season was the 61st season of the Brisbane Rugby League premiership. Eight teams from across Brisbane competed for the premiership, which culminated in Northern Suburbs defeating Fortitude Valley 14–2 in the grand final.

This was the Norths' 8th premiership in an 11-year span and the 8th occasion the BRL grand final featured a Norths-Valleys match up.

Ladder

Finals

Grand Final 
Northern Suburbs 14 (Tries: Metassa, Massie, Goals: Gordon 3, Field Goals: Spring)

Fortitude Valley 2 (Goals: Clarke)

References 

1969 in rugby league
1969 in Australian rugby league
Rugby league in Brisbane